Workers Left Unity – Iran is an Iranian far left political party in exile. The group describes itself as an alliance of the Organisation of Revolutionary Workers of Iran (Rahe Kargar), Iranian Communist Fedayin League, Socialism and Revolution Tendency, Solidarity Campaign with Iranian Workers, Activists of Fedaii Minority.

External links
Official website

Banned communist parties
Banned political parties in Iran
Communist parties in Iran
Political party alliances in Iran